Moallem Kalayeh (also Romanized as Mo’allem Kalāyeh and Mo‘allem Kalāyeh) is a city and capital of Alamut-e Sharqi District, in Qazvin County, Qazvin Province, Iran. At the 2006 census its population was 2,196, in 684 families. People of Moallem Kalayeh are Tat and they speak Tati language.

References 

Qazvin County
Cities in Qazvin Province